Rumbek Airport  is an airport in South Sudan, near Rumbek the capital of Western Lakes State. The airport is served by several national airlines and by air charter service providers.

Location
Rumbek Airport is located in Rumbek Central County, Western Lakes State, in central South Sudan, near the town of Rumbek. The geographical coordinates of this airport are: 6° 49' 48.00"N, 29° 40' 12.00"E (Latitude: 6.83000; Longitude: 29.6700).

Airlines and destinations

Service was provided to Juba, South Sudan by Southern Star Airlines until the airline ceased flying in 2011.

Accidents and incidents
In March 2003, Hawker Siddeley Andover 3C-KKB of 748 Air Services was damaged beyond repair when it crashlanded at Rumbek following an engine failure.
 On 2 May 2008, a Beechcraft 1900c operated by Southern Sudan Air Connection departed Wau (WUU) on a flight to Juba via Rumbek. The airplane was carrying a delegation of leaders from the Sudan People's Liberation Movement (SPLM). Passenger included Dominic Dim Deng, then Southern Sudan's Defense Minister. Near Rumbek both engines failed. The aircraft crashed, killing all on board.

References

External links
Location of Rumbek Airport At Google Maps

Airports in South Sudan
Lakes (state)
Bahr el Ghazal
Rumbek